"Bella y Sensual" is a song by American singer Romeo Santos and Puerto Rican singers Daddy Yankee and Nicky Jam. The song was written by Santos, Nick Caminero and Ramón Rodríguez, with production handled by Santos, Saga WhiteBlack, Tainy & Nely. It was released to digital retailers on October 27, 2017, through Sony Music Latin, as the third single released from Santos' third studio album, Golden.

Background
According to Santos, he wanted to record a reggaeton track, to follow his previously released soundtrack, "Noche de Sexo", with Wisin & Yandel.

Reception
Billboard editor Leila Cobo noted that the song "approaches mainstream trap without betraying Santos' voice".

Music video
The music video was filmed in New York City (where the music video for "Eres Mía" was previously shot) between October 23 and 24 and released on November 24, 2017. It features Dominican model Yovanna Ventura, and Dominican dancers Dahiana Elizabeth and Cristal Sicard as the lead females.

Charts

Weekly charts

Year-end charts

Certifications

References

2017 songs
2017 singles
Romeo Santos songs
Daddy Yankee songs
Nicky Jam songs
Songs written by Romeo Santos
Music videos directed by Jessy Terrero